Goforth may refer to:

People with the surname
Charles Wayne Goforth (1931–2018, American politician
D. Bruce Goforth, American politician
Darren Goforth, US sheriff's deputy shot in 2015
David Goforth, American Baseball player
Jonathan Goforth, Canadian Presbyterian missionary
Randall Goforth, American football player
Robert Goforth, American politician
Rosalind Goforth, Canadian Presbyterian missionary
Susan Goforth, American actress
William Goforth (doctor) (1766–1817), American politician
William Goforth (1731–1807), American politician

Places
Goforth, Kentucky, an unincorporated community in Kentucky, United States
Goforth, Texas, a ghost town in Texas, United States

See also
Go Forth